The Minister of Defence (Rakshā Mantrī) is the head of the Ministry of Defence and a high ranking minister of the Government of India. The Defence Minister is one of the most senior offices in the Union Council of Ministers as well as being a high-level minister in the union cabinet. The defence minister additionally serves as President of the Institute for Defence Studies and Analyses, and as Chancellor of the Defence Institute of Advanced Technology and of the National Defence University.

They are often assisted by a Minister of State for Defence and less-commonly, the lower-ranked Deputy Minister of Defence.

The first defence minister of independent India was Baldev Singh Chokkar, who served in Prime Minister Jawaharlal Nehru's cabinet during 1947–52. Rajnath Singh is the current defence minister of India.

List of Defence Ministers

List of Ministers of State

See also

Ministry of Defence (AKHAND BHARAT )
 Defence ministers

References

  
Union ministers of India
Lists of government ministers of India